Pruzhany is a former airbase of the Belarusian Air Force located near Pruzhany, Brest Region, Belarus.

The base was home to the:
 206th Independent Assault Aviation Regiment between 1984 and 1993 with the Sukhoi Su-25 (ASCC: Frogfoot) and the Aero L-39 Albatros
 357th Independent Assault Aviation Regiment between 1984 and 1985 with the Su-25 and the L-39
 330th Independent Helicopter Regiment between 1976 and 1987 with the Mil Mi-8 (ASCC: Hip) and the Mil Mi-24 (ASCC: Hind)
 181st Independent Helicopter Regiment between 1988 and 1992 with the Mi-8 and Mi-24
 953rd Assault Aviation Regiment between 1945 and 1946 with the Ilyushin Il-2 (ASCC: Bark)
 225th Independent Helicopter Regiment between 1972 and 1977 with Mil Mi-4 (ASCC: Hound) and the Mi-8
 163rd Guards Fighter Aviation Regiment between 1952 and 1961 with the Mikoyan-Gurevich MiG-15 (ASCC: Fagot) and the Mikoyan-Gurevich MiG-17 (ASCC: Fresco)

References

Military installations of Belarus